Charles Cutter may refer to:

 Charles Ammi Cutter (1837–1903), American librarian
 Charles Cutter (MP) for Eye